Dion Russell (born 8 May 1975) is an Australian former racewalker, born in Melbourne, who competed in the 1996 Summer Olympics and in the 2000 Summer Olympics.

References

1975 births
Living people
Athletes from Melbourne
Australian male racewalkers
Olympic athletes of Australia
Athletes (track and field) at the 1996 Summer Olympics
Athletes (track and field) at the 2000 Summer Olympics
Commonwealth Games competitors for Australia
Athletes (track and field) at the 1998 Commonwealth Games
Sportsmen from Victoria (Australia)